Samuel Coco-Viloin (born 19 October 1987 in Conflans-Sainte-Honorine) is a track and field hurdler who competes internationally for France.

Coco-Viloin represented France at the 2008 Summer Olympics in Beijing. He competed at the 4x100 metres relay together with Martial Mbandjock, Manuel Reynaert and Yannick Lesourd. In their qualification heat they placed sixth in a time of 39.53 seconds and they were eliminated.

Major competitions record

References
 

1987 births
People from Conflans-Sainte-Honorine
Living people
French male sprinters
French male hurdlers
Olympic athletes of France
Athletes (track and field) at the 2008 Summer Olympics
Sportspeople from Yvelines
Competitors at the 2009 Summer Universiade
Competitors at the 2011 Summer Universiade